Spring Grove Village is a neighborhood in Cincinnati, Ohio formerly known as Winton Place.  It is located just off Interstate 75 in the Mill Creek Valley. The population was 1,916 at the 2020 census.

It is bordered by the neighborhoods of Clifton, Northside, College Hill, and Winton Hills, and the city of St. Bernard.

History
 
Historically known as both The Mill Creek Township Farm and Spring Grove, this canal and railroad town was incorporated in 1882, then annexed to the city of Cincinnati in November 1903.  

Railroad lines to the north from Cincinnati Union Terminal passed through the Winton Place station.

For many years the neighborhood was known as Winton Place. In early 2007, the residents of Winton Place officially voted to change the name to Spring Grove Village. Spring Grove Cemetery and Arboretum is located within the neighborhood.

References

External links
Spring Grove Village Community Council

Neighborhoods in Cincinnati